Goodspeed Glacier is a small hanging glacier on the south wall of Wright Valley in Victoria Land, Antarctica, between Hart Glacier and Denton Glacier. It was named by U.S. geologist Robert Nichols after Robert Goodspeed, geological assistant to Nichols at nearby Marble Point in the 1959–60 field season.

Further reading
 Gunter Faure, Teresa M. Mensing,  The Transantarctic Mountains: Rocks, Ice, Meteorites and Water, P 716
 Edmund Stump, The Ross Orogen of the Transantarctic Mountains, P 104
 James G. Bockheim, The Soils of Antarctica, P 129
 Denton, George H., Sugden David, E., Marchant, David R., Hall, Brenda L. and Wilch, Thomas I., EAST ANTARCTIC ICE SHEET SENSITIVITY TO PLIOCENE CLIMATIC CHANGE FROM A DRY VALLEYS PERSPECTIVE ,  Geogr. Ann. 75 A (4): 155–204, P 192

References

Glaciers of McMurdo Dry Valleys